Konsu järv is a lake of Estonia.

The water of Lake Konsu is piped to Ahtme Power Plant, 12 km northwest, where it is used as the cooling water.

See also
List of lakes of Estonia

Konsu
Alutaguse Parish
Konsu